Memecylon urceolatum is a species of plant in the family Melastomataceae. It is endemic to Sri Lanka.

References

Endemic flora of Sri Lanka
urceolatum
Vulnerable plants
Taxonomy articles created by Polbot
Taxa named by Alfred Cogniaux